Raymond William Butt (25 June 1935 – 12 July 2013) was a British television producer and director. He worked on several sitcoms for BBC television and became best known for Only Fools and Horses.

Early life
Butt grew up in London as an only child with his mother and father. He left school at 16 and served in the Royal Air Force for his national service.

Career

He produced Only Fools and Horses until Series 5, directing most episodes himself, when he moved onto new projects. He also worked on Last of the Summer Wine and Are You Being Served?. Butt directed the 1976 two-part episode from Last of the Summer Wine's third series consisting of the episodes, "The Great Boarding House Bathroom Caper" and "Cheering up Gordon." Butt would also serve as primary producer for Are You Being Served? between 1975 and 1977. He frequently collaborated with writer John Sullivan, directing for four different series written by Sullivan.

Butt retired in 1989. He received two BAFTAs, one for Only Fools and Horses and one for Just Good Friends.

Death
Butt died on 12 July 2013 and was survived by his partner, Jo Blyth, and a daughter from an earlier marriage.

Filmography
The Liver Birds (1969–1979)
Are You Being Served? (1975–1977)
Last of the Summer Wine (1976)
Citizen Smith (1977–1979)
Only Fools and Horses (1981–1987)
Just Good Friends (1983–1984)
Dear John (1986-1987)
Young, Gifted and Broke (1989)
 Sob Sisters (1989)

References

External links
 

1935 births
2013 deaths
20th-century Royal Air Force personnel
BAFTA winners (people)
BBC television producers
British television directors